Robert Fairchild (born June 9, 1987) is an American dancer and actor. He is best known for originating the role Jerry Mulligan in the musical An American in Paris, and as Munkustrap in the 2019 film Cats. He was a principal dancer at the New York City Ballet.

Early life
Fairchild was raised in Salt Lake City. His mother is a dietitian and his father worked for Utah's wildlife resources. He started dancing at the age of four, and began formal ballet training at age ten. After attending the School of American Ballet's summer intensives in 2002 and 2003, he relocated to New York City and enrolled in the school as a full-time student in fall 2003.

Fairchild's elder sister, Megan, is also a principal dancer at the New York City Ballet.

Career

Dance
Fairchild became an apprentice at the New York City Ballet in 2005, and joined the company's corps de ballet the following year. He became a soloist in 2007 and principal dancer in 2009. During his time in the company, he had danced works by George Balanchine, Jerome Robbins, Christopher Wheeldon, Alexei Ratmansky and Justin Peck.

In October 2017, Fairchild left the company after a performance of Balanchine's Duo Concertant, he danced with his long time stage partner, Sterling Hyltin.

Acting
In December 2014, Fairchild starred as Jerry Mulligan in the musical An American in Paris, directed and choreographed by Christopher Wheeldon, in Théâtre du Châtelet, Paris, which ran until January 2015. The musical also starred Leanne Cope. The musical transferred to Palace Theatre on Broadway the same year. The previews began in March and officially opened on April 12. He and Cope starred in the show until his departure in March 2016. He was nominated for a Tony Award for Best Actor in a Musical in 2015 In 2017, the show premiered in Dominion Theatre on West End. Fairchild and Cope returned to the show, though he only stayed for three months.

Fairchild had also starred in A Chorus Line at the Hollywood Bowl, Oklahoma! at the Royal Albert Hall in London and Brigadoon at the New York City Center.

He played Munkustrap in Cats, the 2019 film adaptation of the stage musical of the same name. He also appeared in the 2019 Netflix series, Soundtrack.

Other ventures
In 2020, in the midst of the COVID-19 pandemic, Fairchild started his floral arrangement business, boo.kay, which was intended to be a "side hustle".

Personal life
Fairchild married New York City principal ballet dancer Tiler Peck in 2014. The couple separated in 2017. He later came out publicly as gay.

References

American male ballet dancers
New York City Ballet principal dancers
School of American Ballet alumni
Mae L. Wien Award recipients
American male musical theatre actors
American gay actors
Living people
1987 births